Letcher County is a county located in the U.S. state of Kentucky. As of the 2020 census, the population was 21,548. Its county seat is Whitesburg. The county, founded in 1842, is named for Robert P. Letcher, Governor of Kentucky from 1840 to 1844.

History
Letcher County is a dry county, with the only exceptions being the Highland Winery, the city of Whitesburg, and the city of Jenkins.

Harry M. Caudill's 1963 book, Night Comes to the Cumberlands: A Biography of a Depressed Area, brought the county to national attention.  The CBS documentary Christmas in Appalachia (1964) hosted by Charles Kuralt also brought the nation's attention to Letcher County as citizens sent clothes and gifts in response to the conditions of those featured.

Geography
Letcher County's natural areas include Bad Branch Falls and the Lilley Cornett Woods.

Adjacent counties
 Knott County  (northwest)
 Pike County  (northeast)
 Wise County, Virginia  (southeast)
 Harlan County  (south)
 Perry County  (southwest)

National protected area
 Jefferson National Forest (part)

State protected area
 Bad Branch Falls State Nature Preserve
 Lilley Cornett Woods Experiment Station (Eastern Kentucky University)

State Parks
 Kingdom Come State Park (part)
 Pine Mountain Trail State Scenic Trail (part)

Pioneer Horse Trail controversy

In an effort to bring tourists to Letcher County and to revitalize the local economy, the Pioneer Horse Trail was constructed on Pine Mountain. The trail, part of an "adventure tourism" initiative spearheaded by then Governor Steve Beshear, Beshear's wife Jane, and Lieutenant Governor Daniel Mongiardo, was completed in 2009.

However, controversy arose about whether the environment would be harmed during construction. In the summer of 2008, the Letcher County Fiscal Court had signed an agreement with state officials stating that the county would do an environmental impact study before construction would begin. Documents obtained by the Lexington Herald-Leader under Kentucky's Open Records Act showed that construction actually began before the study was to take place. County-owned bulldozers started clearing trees in part of a wildlife management area in which heavy equipment was not permitted. Environmental groups are asking the U.S. Fish and Wildlife Service to determine if any species on the threatened or endangered list were harmed.

Demographics

As of the census of 2000, there were 25,277 people, 10,085 households, and 7,462 families residing in the county. The racial makeup of the county was 98.71% White, 0.51% Black or African American, 0.10% Native American, 0.28% Asian, 0.02% Pacific Islander, 0.03% from other races, and 0.35% from two or more races. 0.44% of the population were Hispanic or Latino of any race.

There were 10,085 households, out of which 32.30% had children under the age of 18 living with them, 58.40% were married couples living together, 11.50% had a female householder with no husband present, and 26.00% were non-families. 24.10% of all households were made up of individuals, and 10.10% had someone living alone who was 65 years of age or older. The average household size was 2.48 and the average family size was 2.94.

The age distribution was 23.70% under the age of 18, 9.20% from 18 to 24, 28.70% from 25 to 44, 25.80% from 45 to 64, and 12.60% who were 65 years of age or older. The median age was 38 years. For every 100 females there were 95.80 males. For every 100 females age 18 and over, there were 92.10 males.

The median income for a household in the county was $21,110, and the median income for a family was $24,869. Males had a median income of $30,488 versus $17,902 for females. The per capita income for the county was $11,984. About 23.70% of families and 27.10% of the population were below the poverty line, including 35.90% of those under age 18 and 21.20% of those age 65 or over.

Education
Two public school districts operate in the county.

Letcher County Public Schools

Most K-12 students in the county, with the exception of those living in the far eastern part of the county surrounding Jenkins, are served by the Letcher County Public Schools. The district operates nine elementary/middle schools, one vocational school, one high school, and an alternative education center.

In 2005, the doors to the new Letcher County Central High School were opened in Ermine (the school's postal address, however, is in Whitesburg), with total costs of over $25,000,000. The school's nickname is the Cougars, and the school colors are blue, black, and silver.  The school volleyball team has been to the state tournament every year since its creation and the wrestling team has had multiple regional champions. The baseball team has claimed three region titles in 2007, 2011, and 2013, with two state tournament appearances and one semi-state appearance. The boys Cross Country team has had 3 region championships and an individual region champion. The Girls basketball team made a State sweet sixteen appearance.

Jenkins Independent Schools
Students in the Jenkins area are served by the Jenkins Independent Schools, which operates two elementary schools (located on two campuses in the communities of McRoberts and Burdine) and a combined middle and high school with grades 7–12. Jenkins Independent Schools celebrated its 100th year in 2012. The middle/high school's athletic nickname is the Cavaliers/Lady Cavaliers. The school colors are Kelly Green and White.

Politics
Letcher County has a somewhat similar political history to West Virginia. Under the Fourth Party System it was a reliable Republican county, voting Republican in every election from 1884 to 1928. However, with increasing unionization under the New Deal it turned for the next sixty to seventy years into a fairly solid Democratic county, apart from the 1956 and 1972 landslides and the candidacy of John F. Kennedy. However, since 2004 as the Democratic Party has become opposed to coal production due to global warming issues, it has now become a solidly Republican county.

Economy

Coal companies in Letcher County
 Alpha Natural Resources
 James River Coal Company
 Rhino Resource Partners
 United Coal Company

Media

Television
Two Public-access television cable TV channels serve Letcher County. The Letcher County Government Channel is Government-access television (GATV), operated by the Letcher County Fiscal Court and airs government meetings, local events, and emergency information. LCPS-TV is operated by the Letcher County Public Schools and airs school announcements, events, and Educational access television programs.

Radio
 WTCW
 WXKQ-FM
 WMMT (FM), community radio station owned by Appalshop
 WIFX-FM
 WKVG
 WNKW

Newspapers
 The Mountain Eagle
 Letcher County Community News-Press

Infrastructure

Transportation
Public transportation is provided by LKLP Community Action Partnership with demand-response service and scheduled service from Whitesburg to Hazard.

Events

Whitesburg's July 4 Celebration, is a free event held on the Fourth of July at Riverside Park. The event includes free music, entertainment, fireworks and fun.
Whitesburg Labor Day Celebration, a one-day festival held in Riverside Park on Labor Day Monday. It features food, as well as free music, entertainment and inflatables for the kids.
 The town of Fleming-Neon, hosts its annual Neon Area Days the second Friday and Saturday in September. Neon is home to gospel singer Martha Carson. In 1998 she returned to Neon for the festival and was honored.
 The Mountain Heritage Festival is held in Whitesburg during the last full week of September.
 In Jenkins, Jenkins Homecoming Days are also celebrated annually in August.

Communities

Cities
 Blackey
 Fleming-Neon
 Jenkins
 Whitesburg (county seat)

Census-designated places
 Mayking
 McRoberts
 Millstone
 Payne Gap

Other unincorporated places

 Beefhide (partial)
 Burdine
 Deane
 Dunham
 Eolia
 Ermine
 Gaskill
 Gilley
 Hemphill
 Isom
 Jeremiah
 Letcher
 Seco

Notable people
 Harry M. Caudill (1922–1990), author, historian, professor, lawyer, legislator, and environmentalist
 Jack K. Hale (1928–2009), mathematician
 Emery L. Frazier (Mayor, state representative, Chief Clerk of the U.S. Senate, Secretary of the U.S. Senate, 1896–1973)
 Gary Stewart (Country music singer and musician, 1944–2003)
 Martha Carson (Country/gospel music singer, 1920–2004)
 Lee Sexton (Country, bluegrass, old-time musician)
 Tom Gish, died 2008, publisher of the Mountain Eagle in Whitesburg, grew up in the county
 Francis Gary Powers (August 17, 1929 – August 1, 1977) was an American pilot whose CIA U-2 spy plane was shot down while over the Soviet Union, causing the 1960 U-2 incident.
 Kenny Baker (June 26, 1926 – July 8, 2011) was an American fiddle player best known for his 25-year tenure with Bill Monroe and his group The Blue Grass Boys.
 Jessamyn Duke (mixed-martial artist, professional wrestler)

See also

 Caudill, Harry M., Author of Night Comes to the Cumberlands (1963). 
 National Register of Historic Places listings in Letcher County, Kentucky

References

Further reading

External links
 

 
Kentucky counties
Appalachian culture in Kentucky
Counties of Appalachia
Populated places established in 1842
1842 establishments in Kentucky